Hryni is a village in Belarus. It is located in the Minsk District of Minsk Region, 30 km north of the capital Minsk.

References

External links 
 
 Location including the places

Villages in Belarus
Populated places in Minsk Region
Minsk District